Ronneby Municipality (Ronneby kommun) is a municipality in Blekinge County in South Sweden in southern Sweden. It borders to Tingsryd Municipality, Emmaboda Municipality, Karlskrona Municipality and Karlshamn Municipality. The town of Ronneby is the seat of the municipality.

The present municipality was created in 1967 through the amalgamation of the City of Ronneby with three surrounding units.

Localities 
There are 8 urban areas (also called a Tätort or locality) in Ronneby Municipality.

In the table the localities are listed according to the size of the population as of December 31, 2010. The municipal seat is in bold characters.

Politics 
Ronneby was run by the Social Democratic Party for over 80 consecutive years, until a right wing coalition won the election in 2010. This coalition consists of the Moderate Party (23,5 %), the Center Party (11,8 %), the Peoples Party (5,7%), the Christian Democrats (1,8%) and the Ronneby Party (7,2%). The chairman of the municipal board of directors is moderate Roger Fredriksson.
The Ronneby Party is a party with local interests formed before the national election of 1994. In 1998 the party had got 6.3% of the votes and three seats in the municipal council. In 2002 the vote share was reduced to 3.0%.

Parishes 
Parishes ordered by hundreds:

 Bräkne Hundred
 Bräkne-Hoby Parish
 Öljehult Parish
 Medelstad Hundred
 Backaryd Parish
 Edestad Parish
 Eringsboda Parish
 Förkärla Parish
 Hjortsberga Parish
 Listerby Parish
 Ronneby Parish

International relations

  Bornholm, Denmark
  Mänttä, Finland
  Steglitz-Zehlendorf, Germany
  Schopfheim, Germany
  Høyanger, Norway
  Elbląg, Poland
  Slavsk, Russia
  Enfield, Connecticut, United States
  Johnson City, Tennessee, United States

See also
 Trolleboda, a village located here

References

External links

 
Municipalities of Blekinge County